Weston is a census-designated place (CDP) in the town of Weston, Fairfield County, Connecticut, United States. It comprises the center of town government and surrounding residential areas. The area was known as "Norfield" from 1795 to 1920, and the Norfield Historic District, which occupies the center of the CDP, around the intersection of Norfield Road and Weston Road, preserves the older name.

The CDP is in the southwest part of the town of Weston. Connecticut Routes 53 and 57 pass through the community. Route 57 leads south  to the center of Westport and north  to Georgetown, while Route 53 leads northeast  to Redding and southwest the same distance to the center of Norwalk.

Weston was first listed as a CDP prior to the 2020 census.

References 

Census-designated places in Fairfield County, Connecticut
Census-designated places in Connecticut